Project FIRE (Flight Investigation Reentry Environment) was a United States National Air and Space Administration NASA effort to determine the effects of Atmospheric entry on spacecraft materials.  Project FIRE used both ground testing in wind tunnels and flight tests to test the effects of reentry heating on spacecraft materials. Wind tunnel testing occurred at the 4-foot Unitary Plan Wind Tunnel, the High-Temperature Tunnel, and the Thermal Structures Tunnel at the  Langley Research Center located in Hampton, Virginia. Recoverable reentry packages were flight tested using the Atlas-D Antares-2. Project Fire flight tests originated from Launch Complex 12 at Cape Canaveral Air Force Station in Florida, United States.

Flights

FIRE 1 - 14.04.1964 - Atlas-D Antares-2
An Atlas D launch vehicle (missile 263D) lifted a Project FIRE spacecraft to an altitude of 122 km. After coasting to an apogee of more than 800 km, the velocity package would then FIRE the reentry vehicle into a minus 15 degree trajectory at a velocity of 11,300 meters per second.
During the spacecraft's fall toward earth, a solid-fuel Antares II rocket behind the payload fired for 30 seconds, increasing the descent speed to 40,501 kilometers per hour. Instruments in the spacecraft radioed temperature data to the ground. The spacecraft exterior reached an estimated temperature of 11,400 K. About 32 minutes after launch, the spacecraft impacted into the Atlantic Ocean.

FIRE 2 - 22.05.1965 - Atlas-D Antares-2
During the second test, an Atlas D booster (missile 264D) propelled the instrumented probe, called a "flying thermometer," into a ballistic trajectory over 805 km high. After 26 minutes of flight, when the spacecraft began its descent, the Antares rocket accelerated its fall. The probe entered the atmosphere at a speed of 40,877 km per hour and generated temperatures of about 11,206 K. Data on heating were transmitted to ground stations throughout the descent. Thirty-two minutes after the launch - and but six minutes after the Antares was fired - the device impacted in the Atlantic about 8,256 km southeast of the Cape.

References

NASA programs